Dragomir Yordanov (born 28 September 1967) is a Bulgarian judge and a politician who served as the caretaker justice minister from 12 March 2013 to 29 May 2013.

Early life and education
Yordanov was born in Sofia on 28 September 1967. He graduated from Sofia French Language School and Sofia University St. Kliment Ohridski with a master's degree in law.

Career
Yordanov was a junior judge and then a criminal judge in the Sofia District Court from 1994 to 1999. Then he worked as the executive director of the Magistrate Training Centre from 1999 to 2004. He was the deputy director and programme director of National Institute of Justice from 2004 to 2011. In addition, he worked as a criminal judge in Kosovo as part of the European Union Rule of Law Mission from 2009 to 2010. Next Yordanov served as the director of the National Institute of Justice from 2011 to March 2013. He was appointed justice minister to the caretaker government led by prime minister Marin Raykov on 12 March 2013. Yordanov was replaced by Zinaida Zlatanova in the post on 29 May 2013.

References

1967 births
Living people
Sofia University alumni
Judiciary of Bulgaria
Bulgarian judges
People from Sofia
Government ministers of Bulgaria
Justice ministers of Bulgaria